The 2016 Tameside Metropolitan Borough Council election took place on 5 May 2016 to elect members of Tameside Metropolitan Borough Council in England. This was on the same day as other local elections.

After the election, the composition of the council was:

Labour 51
Conservative 6

Results

Ashton Hurst ward

Ashton St. Michaels ward

Ashton Waterloo ward

Audenshaw ward

Denton North East ward

Denton South ward

Denton West ward

Droylsden East ward

Droylsden West ward

Dukinfield ward

Dukinfield / Stalybridge ward

Hyde Godley ward

Hyde Newton ward

Hyde Werneth ward

Longdendale ward

Mossley ward
Double election due to the resignation of Labour's Idu Miah (elected May 2015). His seat was retained for Labour by Tafheen Sharif.

St. Peters ward

Stalybridge North ward

Stalybridge South ward

References

2016 English local elections
2016
2010s in Greater Manchester